James Wells Kilby (born 1963) is a United States Navy vice admiral who serves as the deputy commander of the United States Fleet Forces Command since July 2021. He most recently served as the Deputy Chief of Naval Operations for Warfighting Requirements and Capabilities since July 23, 2019. Previously, he was the Director of Integrated Warfare. Raised in Pound Ridge, New York, Kilby is a 1986 graduate of the United States Naval Academy.

In July 2021, he was nominated to succeed David Kriete as deputy commander of the United States Fleet Forces Command.

References

External links

1963 births
Living people
Place of birth missing (living people)
United States Naval Academy alumni
United States Navy admirals